Lady Ōnu (d. 6 August 724) was a Japanese noblewoman. She was the daughter of Soga no Akae and bunin to Emperor Tenmu, with whom she had three children:
Prince Hozumi (穂積皇子) (d. 715)
Princess Ki (紀皇女) (?–?)
Princess Takata (田形皇女) (d. 728), Saiō in Ise Shrine (706–707), and married to Prince Mutobe later

Year of birth uncertain
724 deaths
Emperor Tenmu